Austrarchaea alani is a species of spider in the family Archaeidae. It is endemic to south-east Queensland, Australia where it is found in the Kroombit Tops National Park.

References 

Spiders described in 2011
Archaeidae